Alicia Abella is an American engineer. She served on the President's Advisory Commission on Educational Excellence for Hispanics, and has received Columbia University Medal of Excellence. In 2011, she was inducted into the WITI Hall of Fame.

Biography 
She received a bachelor's degree from New York University and an MS, MPhil, and PhD from Columbia University. She married Aleksandar Timcenko, a quantitative finance professional who would go on to hold roles at DE Shaw and Goldman Sachs.

Immediately following graduation, she was employed by Bell Labs, where she would reach Executive Director of the Innovative Services Research Department, and later manage the Cloud Services research platform. In 2010, Hispanic Business magazine named Abella one of the top five women of the year. In 2013, she was awarded the Columbia University Medal of Excellence. In 2011, she was appointed to the President's Advisory Commission on Educational Excellence for Hispanics. She has received awards from the Women of Color STEM Conference. Abella also was awarded the Leadership of the Year Award by the Latinos in Information Sciences and Technology Association.

In 2020, she joined Google as a Managing Director for Telecom, Media & Entertainment Industry Solutions.

References 

Living people
Year of birth missing (living people)
Place of birth missing (living people)
American women engineers
New York University alumni
Columbia School of Engineering and Applied Science alumni
21st-century women engineers
21st-century American women